Woo Sang-ho may refer to:
 Woo Sang-ho (footballer)
 Woo Sang-ho (politician)